The 20th TVyNovelas Awards, is an Academy of special awards to the best soap operas and TV shows. The awards ceremony took place on July 4, 2002, in Mexico D.F. The ceremony was televised in Mexico by El canal de las estrellas.

Raúl Velasco, Ernesto Laguardia, Luis de la Corte and Gloria Calzada hosted the show. El manantial won 10 awards, the most for the evening, including Best Telenovela. Other winners Amigas y rivales and Salomé won 2 awards and Entre el amor y el odio and Sin pecado concebido won 1 each.

Summary of awards and nominations

Winners and nominees

Telenovelas

Others

Special Awards
Artistic Career: Carmen Salinas
Career as Comedian: Sergio Corona
Career as Animator: Don Francisco
Career as Singer: Marco Antonio Solís
Singer of the Year: Paulina Rubio
Ranchero Singer of highest International Projection: Pedro Fernández
Most Charismatic Host of Hoy: Alfredo Adame
Best Ranchero Singer: Pepe Aguilar
"Silvia Derbez" Award: Olivia Bucio for El Manantial

International Segment 
This ceremony was held 20 years the magazine rewards the actors Televisa counting as interviewers Maxine Woodside, it tells the story in which TVyNovelas points to the winning soap operas every year, too to stories or adaptations of them, and even the actors they won.

Recognition Awards 
The magazine "Recordar es vivir" selected each of the actors in full revelation recognition in each category and, therefore, as part of the commemoration of the 20 years of the TVyNovelas Awards that every year they won the award for category rewarding only one of each annual ceremony, among them are:

Laura Flores (1983)
Ernesto Alonso (1984)
Victoria Ruffo (1985)
Arturo Peniche (1986)
Marco Antonio Muñiz (1987)
Sebastián Ligarde (1988)
Jacqueline Andere (1989)
Ludwika Paleta (1990)
Eduardo Capetillo (1991)
Diana Bracho (1992)
María Sorté (1993)
Enrique Rocha (1994)
Natalia Esperón (1995)
Javier López "Chabelo" (1996)
Juan Soler (1997)
Jorge Salinas (2000)
Helena Rojo (2001)
Sergio Corona (2002)

References 

TVyNovelas Awards
TVyNovelas Awards
TVyNovelas Awards
TVyNovelas Awards ceremonies